Barbaria was the name used by the ancient Greeks for littoral northeast Africa. The corresponding Arabic term, bilad al-Barbar (land of the Barbar), was used in the Middle Ages. The name of Barbaria is preserved today in the name of the Somali city of Berbera, the city known to the Greeks as Malao.

Greek sources
According to the Periplus of the Erythraean Sea, a 1st-century travelogue written by a Greek merchant based in Alexandria, Barbaria extended from the border of Egypt just south of Berenice Troglodytica to just north of Ptolemais Theron. From there to the Bab-el-Mandeb was the kingdom ruled by Zoskales (possibly Aksum), after which the "rest of Barbaria" extended to Opone. This second Barbaria was the location of the so-called "far-side" ports.

In the Geography of Ptolemy (2nd century), Barbaria is said to extend even further, as far south as Zanzibar, although the land south of Opone is called Azania in the Periplus. Ptolemy describes the city of Rhapta as the "metropolis of Barbaria". Barbaria is also mentioned in Marcian of Heraclea. Later sources (Cosmas Indicopleustes and Stephanus of Byzantium) place it on the African side of the Arabian Sea.

The first contact of the Greeks with Barbaria came in the 3rd century BC, when the Ptolemies set up bases for elephant hunting. These bases remained in use as ports for the export of myrrh and frankincense throughout antiquity. There were many smaller ports that exported tortoiseshell and ivory. In the Periplus, Barbaria is said to lack central government and is ruled by local chiefs. Azania, on the other hand, is subject to the Sabaeans and Himyarites. In the Periplus, the inhabitants of the first Barbaria, or the Barbarike chora (Barbarian region), include the eponymous Barbaroi (Barbarians, Berbers), but also Ichthyophagoi (fish eaters), Agriophagoi (wild beast eaters) and Moschophagoi (shoot eaters). These are probably the same people as the Trogodytes of other ancient geographers. The Moschophagoi may correspond to the Rhizophagoi (root eaters) and Spermatophagoi (seed eaters) of other geographers.

Arabic sources
Arabic sources refer to the coast as the Baḥr Berberā or al-Khalīj al-Berberī and its inhabitants as the Berbera or Berābir. They are the Somalis, distinguished from the Habash to their north and the Zanj to their south. From Arabic, this terminology for northeast Africa entered Hebrew (Barbara), Persian (Barbaristan) and even Chinese (Pi-pa-li). Most of these usages are associated with Somalia. The Chinese term, although probably derived from Berbera, refers to the coast and hinterland and not just the port.

See also
Barabra
Land of Punt

References

External links
Periplus of the Erythraean Sea - Schoff translation

Historical regions
Horn of Africa